Feruza Bobokhujaeva (born 5 October 1999) is an Uzbekistani footballer who plays as a forward for Women's Championship club Sevinch. She has been a member of the Uzbekistan women's national team.

International career
Bobokhujaeva capped for Uzbekistan at senior level during the 2018 CAFA Women's Championship.

See also
List of Uzbekistan women's international footballers

References 

1999 births
Living people
Uzbekistani women's footballers
Uzbekistan women's international footballers
Women's association football forwards
People from Qashqadaryo Region
21st-century Uzbekistani women